The Philippine forest roundleaf bat (Hipposideros obscurus) is a species of bat in the family Hipposideridae. It is endemic to the Philippines.

Taxonomy and etymology
It was described as a new species in 1861 by German naturalist Wilhelm Peters. Peters initially placed it in the now-defunct genus Phyllorhina, with the scientific name Phyllorhina obscura. Its species name "obscurus" is Latin for "dark".

References

Hipposideros
Mammals of the Philippines
Endemic fauna of the Philippines
Mammals described in 1861
Taxa named by Wilhelm Peters
Taxonomy articles created by Polbot
Bats of Southeast Asia